WCXS is a commercial radio station in Arcadia, Florida, broadcasting on 1480 AM with a classic country format. The station previously ran a slate of syndicated talk programing including Doug Stephan, Todd Starnes and Sean Hannity, as well as the shows of financial councilor Dave Ramsey and news/talk personality Tom Sullivan, and hourly news updates from CBS Radio News. Weekends featured a combination of news and do it yourself programming.

The station changed its call sign from WFLN to WCXS on March 3, 2020. In late May 2020, WCXS changed its format from news/talk to classic country, branded as "Classic Country 104.5".

Historic WFLN
The call sign WFLN was originally assigned in 1949 to a Philadelphia FM radio station located at 95.7 MHz. The station operated primarily a classical music format. In 1956, WFLN (900 kHz) was started as a simulcast of the FM programming. WFLN was sold in 1985 and became WDVT. WFLN-FM continued operations until 1997 when it was sold, changed format and was renamed WXXM. As of 2020 the Philadelphia 95.7 MHz station is identified by the call sign WBEN-FM.

References

External links
Station website

CXS
Classic country radio stations in the United States
1955 establishments in Florida
Radio stations established in 1955